Rzeczyca Długa  is a village in the administrative district of Gmina Radomyśl nad Sanem, within Stalowa Wola County, Subcarpathian Voivodeship, in south-eastern Poland. The village is located in the historical region Galicia.

The village has an approximate population of 800.

References

Villages in Stalowa Wola County